UCSF Chimera (or simply Chimera) is an extensible program for interactive visualization and analysis of molecular structures and related data, including density maps, supramolecular assemblies, sequence alignments, docking results, trajectories, and conformational ensembles. High-quality images and movies can be created. Chimera includes complete documentation and can be downloaded free of charge for noncommercial use.

Chimera is developed by the Resource for Biocomputing, Visualization, and Informatics (RBVI) at the University of California, San Francisco. Development is partially supported by the National Institutes of Health (NIGMS grant P41-GM103311). 
The next-generation program is UCSF ChimeraX.

General structure analysis 

 automatic identification of atom
 hydrogen addition and partial charge assignment
 high-quality hydrogen bond, contact, and clash detection
 measurements: distances, angles, surface area, volume
 calculation of centroids, axes, planes and associated measurements
 amino acid rotamer libraries, protein Ramachandran plot, protein contact map
 structure building and bond rotation
 molecular dynamics trajectory playback (many formats), distance and angle plots  
 morphing between conformations of a protein or even different proteins
 display of attributes (B-factor, hydrophobicity, etc.) with colors, radii, "worms"
 easy creation of custom attributes with simple text file inputs
 ViewDock tool to facilitate interactive screening of docking results
 rich set of commands, powerful specification syntax
 many formats read, PDB and Mol2 written
 Web and fetch from Protein Data Bank, CATH or SCOP (domains), EDS (density maps), EMDB (density maps), ModBase (comparative models), CASTp (protein pocket measurements), Pub3D (small molecule structures), VIPERdb (icosahedral virus capsids), UniProt (protein sequences with feature annotations), others
 interfaces to PDB2PQR charge/radius assignment, APBS electrostatics calculations, AutoDock Vina single-ligand docking

Presentation images and movies 

 high-resolution images
 visual effects including depth-cueing, interactive shadows, silhouette edges, multicolor backgrounds
 standard molecular representations (sticks, spheres, ribbons, molecular surfaces)
 pipes-and-planks for helices and strands; nucleotide objects including lollipops and ladder rungs
 ellipsoids to show anisotropic B-factors
 nonmolecular geometric objects
 renderings of density maps and other volume data (see below)
 labeling with text, symbols, arrows, color keys
 different structures can be clipped differently and at any angle
 optional raytracing with bundled POV-Ray
 scene export to X3D and other formats
 simple graphical interface for creating movies interactively
 scenes can be placed as keyframes along an animation timeline
 alternatively, movie content and recording can be scripted; rich set of related commands
 movie recording is integrated with morphing and MD trajectory playback

Volume data tools  

 many formats of volume data maps (electron density, electrostatic potential, others) read, several written 
 interactive threshold adjustment, multiple isosurfaces (mesh or solid), transparent renderings
 fitting of atomic coordinates to maps and maps to maps
 density maps can be created from atomic coordinates
 markers can be placed in maps and connected with smooth paths
 display of individual data planes or multiple orthogonal planes
 volume data time series playback and morphing
 many tools for segmenting and editing maps
 Gaussian smoothing, Fourier transform, other filtering and normalization
 measurements: surface area, surface-enclosed volume, map symmetry, others

Sequence-structure tools  

 many sequence alignment formats read, written
 sequence alignments can be created, edited
 sequences automatically associate with structures
 sequence-structure crosstalk: highlighting in one highlights the other
 protein BLAST search via Web service
 multiple sequence alignment via Clustal Omega  and MUSCLE Web services
 interfaces to MODELLER for homology modeling and loop building
 structure superposition with or without pre-existing sequence alignment
 generation of structure-based sequence alignments from multiple superpositions
 several methods for calculating conservation and displaying values on associated structures
 RMSD header (histogram above the sequences) showing spatial variability of associated structures
 user-defined headers including histograms and colored symbols
 UniProt and CDD feature annotations shown as colored boxes on sequences
 trees in Newick format read/displayed

See also 

 List of molecular graphics systems
 Molecular modelling
 Molecular graphics
 Molecular dynamics
 Molecule editor
 Software for molecular mechanics modeling

References

External links 

 
 Program download
 Program documentation 
 Chimera Image Gallery and Animation Gallery
 Publications about Chimera 
 Resource for Biocomputing, Visualization, and Informatics
 University of California, San Francisco
 UCSF ChimeraX website

Freeware
Molecular modelling software